Carina Vogt (born 5 February 1992) is a German former ski jumper.

Career
She won the first Olympic gold medal ever awarded for women's ski jumping, at the 2014 Sochi Winter Olympic Games. Vogt's international debut was in the Meinerzhagen competition. She participated in the FIS Ski Jumping Continental Cup from 2006 to 2012. Vogt's debut in the FIS Ski Jumping World Cup took place in January 2012 in Hinterzarten. She achieved her first World Cup victory on 18 January 2015 in Zaō, Japan.

At the Nordic World Ski Championships 2013 in Val di Fiemme, she won the bronze medal in the mixed normal hill competition together with Ulrike Gräßler, Richard Freitag, and Severin Freund.

At the Nordic World Ski Championships 2015 in Falun, she won the gold medal in the individual normal hill competition. With the German team (Richard Freitag, Katharina Althaus, Severin Freund), she won another gold medal in the mixed normal hill competition.

She was able to repeat both wins two years later at the Nordic World Ski Championships 2017 in Lahti. This time with her German team mates Markus Eisenbichler, Svenja Würth, Andreas Wellinger.

World Championship results

World Cup

Standings

Wins

References

External links

1992 births
Living people
German female ski jumpers
Olympic ski jumpers of Germany
Ski jumpers at the 2014 Winter Olympics
Ski jumpers at the 2018 Winter Olympics
Medalists at the 2014 Winter Olympics
Olympic gold medalists for Germany
Olympic medalists in ski jumping
FIS Nordic World Ski Championships medalists in ski jumping
People from Schwäbisch Gmünd
Sportspeople from Stuttgart (region)
21st-century German women